Managua Airport  is a military airport based  south of Havana, the capital of Cuba, on the border between Havana and Mayabeque provinces.

See also

Transport in Cuba
List of airports in Cuba

References

External links
OurAirports - Managua

Airports in Cuba